Mimic (Calvin Montgomery Rankin) is a fictional character appearing in American comic books published by Marvel Comics. He was briefly a member of the X-Men in the 1960s, and was the first character to be added to the team after the original line-up and the first X-Man who was not a mutant.

An alternate reality version of Mimic became a popular member of the Exiles, the reality-hopping team.

Publication history

Created by writer Stan Lee and artist Werner Roth, he first appeared in The X-Men #19 (April 1966) as a villain.

Fictional character biography

Origins
Calvin Rankin was born in Passaic, New Jersey. After an accidental mixup of chemicals from his father Ronald Rankin's experiments, he gained the ability to temporarily copy the skills, physical traits, knowledge, and superpowers of any person within close range (approximately ten feet), which led people to fear him. When Ronald found out about this, Ronald retreated with Calvin into a mine where his father worked on a machine which, as he claimed, would make the abilities his son absorbed permanent. However, these experiments with the device caused several power outages in the vicinity; in order to hold off the mob which was tracking these disturbances, Ronald blasted the mine entrance, but was accidentally caught and killed in the explosion, and the device sealed deep inside the mine.

With the X-Men
Calvin first encountered the X-Men when he got into a fight with X-Men members Beast and Iceman in their civilian identities and duplicated their powers to defeat them. He later came across Marvel Girl, and found out her secret after gaining Marvel Girl's telekinetic power. Rankin decided to seek out the X-Men in a plot to get to the machine and make their powers his permanently. Taking the costumed identity "Mimic", he went to their mansion and battled the X-Men. He then escaped them, taking Marvel Girl hostage and drove to the mine, knowing the rest would follow. As the others came near, he regained their abilities, and he used Cyclops's optic power to break through the rubble to the machine. The other X-Men freed Marvel Girl and battled Mimic. Initially, he gained the upper hand and activated the machine after using Professor X's power to understand how the machine worked, but his powers were removed by Ronald's device, as Professor Xavier had expected. Xavier then wiped his memory and let him go.

It was while attending the same college as Jean Grey that his memory returned. In another attempt to gain the X-Men's abilities, Mimic set his sights on joining their ranks, becoming deputy leader in the process when he blackmailed his way into joining the X-Men. As a member of the team, he aided them against Banshee and the Ogre of Factor Three, but soon began to antagonize the other X-Men with his arrogant behavior and ended up expelled after a fight with Cyclops. However, shortly afterwards he saved his ex-teammates from the Super-Adaptoid, defeating the android by tricking it into trying to copy his artificial powers. This battle robbed him of his abilities, and he was left powerless but a better person.

After the X-Men
Eventually, Mimic regained his powers, but they were enhanced to also absorb people's life forces, killing them. As the Beast tried to work out a solution, Calvin seemingly perished in a self-sacrificial fight against the Hulk after absorbing Hulk's gamma radiation. For a long time, the X-Men believed him to be dead. In actuality, Mimic was in a coma which lasted for years. This ended only when the regenerative mutant Wolverine came near him. Mimic's power copied Wolverine's healing ability and he woke up. Mimic also ended up copying Wolverine's other powers, including his claws, but after a confrontation with Wolverine, the Hulk (in his "Joe Fixit" persona) and an artificial intelligence remnant of his father, he began learning self-control by a meditation technique Wolverine taught him.

Mimic's powers soon began to drain the life energy of those around him again. He fled to a remote Siberian village, where he soon encountered X-Force investigating a distress call. X-Force arrived to find a number of dead scientists and the enraged Mimic who illogically blamed X-Force for their deaths. During the fight, Mimic copied Sunspot's powers, and their identical charge caused a large explosion, after which Mimic was nowhere to be found.

Mimic was later recruited by the entity Onslaught and his powers stabilized. Along with the Blob, he confronted X-Force member Warpath. But with the assistance of Risque, Warpath was able to subdue them. Soon after, Onslaught himself was defeated and Operation: Zero Tolerance imprisoned Mimic. Later, Excalibur tracked his telepathic signature and freed him, thinking that he was Professor Xavier. He was injured in this encounter and came to Muir Island to recover.

Excalibur
Mimic became friends with Excalibur. He helps confront the threat of the misguided Feron confronting the team with the Crazy Gang and the Technet. Mimic attends Captain Britain's wedding.

Mimic later joined Mystique's Brotherhood of Mutants and assisted in freeing the real Xavier. That group eventually disbanded, and Mimic was not among later groupings.

Dark X-Men
During the Dark Reign storyline, Mimic became a member of Norman Osborn's personal team of X-Men featured in Matt Fraction's The Uncanny X-Men stint where it was revealed that his unstable behavior was caused by his previously undiagnosed bipolar disorder which is now being treated with medication.

After Emma Frost and Namor defect to the X-Men taking Cloak and Dagger along with, Rankin continues as a member of Osborn's X-Men alongside former Brotherhood member Mystique, Weapon Omega and Dark Beast as they try to capture Nate Grey during Osborn's reign. Osborn forces Mimic to mimic the powers of Weapon Omega and forces the two to siphon Grey, succeeding in neutralizing Nate's powers at least temporarily.

Wolverine's X-Men
After Osborn was taken down by the Avengers following the Siege of Asgard, Mimic and Weapon Omega left H.A.M.M.E.R. where Weapon Omega's powers started acting up. Mimic went to Hank McCoy, the only person who had always aided him when he needed, for help. Mimic took Weapon Omega to the Xavier Institute where Beast found out that Weapon Omega was about to explode. The X-Men tried various ways to prevent the explosion. But in the end, the only way left outside of death was an induced artificial coma. Weapon Omega asked his only friend to do it and Mimic complied. Borrowing Rachel Grey's powers, Mimic put Weapon Omega to sleep promising to stay by the man's side until waking up. After the ordeal, he asked Rogue if he could stay at the school to which Rogue agrees noting that he is going to be a wonderful teacher.

Following the Avengers vs. X-Men storyline, Mimic and Rogue were the only ones to respond to a prison riot at an unnamed prison. Although they were overpowered by the villains Griffin, Icemaster, Lightmaster, Quicksand, Ruby Thursday, Schizoid Man, Silk Fever and Supercharger, Rogue and Mimic were able to stop the riot by copying the powers of Armadillo, Equinox and Man-Bull.

Extermination
When the mutant-hunting Ahab comes from the future to try and kill the time-displaced original five X-Men, a younger version of Cable abducts the displaced team to send them home after killing his future self. He also captures Mimic so that he can amputate Mimic's wings and transplant them to the younger Warren in place of his 'new' cosmically-enhanced wings so as to preserve the timeline, but Mimic makes it clear that he knew what he was signing up for and agreed to the procedure. When Ahab tries to attack Cable's base, Mimic sacrifices himself by posing as the young Cyclops, distracting Ahab long enough for the young X-Men to return to their home time after finding a way to stop Ahab.

Powers and abilities
Mimic is able to copy the knowledge, skills, and powers (if any) of every individual within a certain range of him; different sources list this as anywhere from several feet to a mile radius. In his first appearances, he needed to get within about 5 feet to initially copy someone's powers, but once he copied them he would retain the abilities so long as he was within several miles of them, even if he left that radius and then returned later. This was established shortly after he joined the X-Men, when Professor X had him fly in increasing circles using Angel's wings and he flew beyond his copy range and the wings started to vanish, but they returned immediately when he turned back, but this has been retconned and changed several times. This applies to both superpowered and "normal" abilities, as shown when he duplicated Kitty Pryde's ninja training. He has shown the capacity to manifest numerous powers at the same time, and since he also absorbs knowledge, he can immediately use copied powers with the same skill level as the original owner. However, he occasionally shows difficulty in juggling multiple powers, and his body can be overloaded by absorbing too many at once. Usually the Mimic loses his duplicated abilities once out of range of the owner, but due to the length of time spent with them, his body permanently retains the powers of the original five X-Men: Angel, The Beast, Cyclops, Iceman and Marvel Girl (the High Evolutionary's temporary elimination of the mutant gene once erased these powers from the Mimic's genetic template, but they appear to have returned since). Thus, he has the powers of flight (granted by angelic wings) of Angel, the increased strength and agility of Beast (complete with enlarged hands and feet), the optic blasts of Cyclops (because he lacks Cyclops' brain damage, Mimic is able to control them), the temperature manipulation of Iceman, and the telekinesis of Jean Grey. He partly retains Professor X's telepathic powers, which once caused his telepathic signature to be mistaken for that of Charles Xavier, although he was not shown to be located during more recent searches for Xavier. He may also retain Wolverine's recuperative abilities. Among the characters his powers have temporarily copied are Banshee, Marrow, Gambit, Rogue, Storm, Colossus, Nightcrawler, Shadowcat, Feron, Meggan, Kylun, Micromax, Marvel Girl (Rachel Summers), Wolfsbane, Pete Wisdom, Psylocke, Risque, Siryn, Warpath, Sunspot, Cable, Caliban, Domino, Boom-Boom, Rictor, Cannonball, Shatterstar, Post, Blob, Mystique, Toad, members of the Crazy Gang, Weapon Omega, and numerous others.

The original Mimic as created by Stan Lee and Werner Roth was not a mutant, but received his powers after breathing in some gas during an explosion in his father's laboratory. Later X-Men writer Scott Lobdell claimed it merely awakened and enhanced Mimic's latent mutant powers, but this point is never made in the comics themselves and remains a point of discussion.

Reception
 In 2014, Entertainment Weekly ranked Mimic 78th in their "Let's rank every X-Man ever" list.

Other versions

Age of Apocalypse
In the Age of Apocalypse, Calvin Rankin was a prisoner and test subject of the time travelling Sugar Man who had travelled back from Earth-616 in order to create a plague. Rankin died because of the Sugar Man's experiments. It is unknown if he had the copied powers of any mutants here.

Civil War: House of M
Mimic is one of the government agents (alongside Nuke and Agent Barnes) sent to Genosha to kill Magneto and as many of his followers as possible. He and Nuke served as a distraction while Agent Barnes sneaked into Magneto's headquarters. He then engaged Magneto in battle. But despite all the mutant powers he manipulated simultaneously, he was ultimately defeated when Magneto used an inhibitor collar to disable Mimic's powers. The powers Mimic has copied are of Magneto's and some unnamed Genoshans who possesses the abilities of hydrokinesis, flight (through reptilian wings), claws, optic blasts, cryokinesis, sharp fangs, pyrokinesis, and having multiple eyes.

Exiles

Mimic's heroic counterpart from the parallel world Earth-12 is a founding member of the multiverse-traveling Exiles superhero team. This iteration has a clear mutant origin and his powers have a restriction: he can only copy a maximum of five mutant powers at a time. The copied abilities are about half as powerful as those of the original owners, and he is not able to copy knowledge or skill. For most of his appearances, he retains the powers of Wolverine, Colossus, Cyclops and Beast. He is originally depicted with the feathered wings of Angel, but gives those up in order to briefly copy the Dark Phoenix's powers, and soon after mimics Northstar's abilities.

In this reality, Calvin Rankin joined the Brotherhood of Mutants and was defeated by the X-Men. Abandoned by the Brotherhood, Mimic was imprisoned and was only freed by Professor X's intervention, inviting him to join the X-Men. Mimic became a dedicated member. His abilities raised the team's morale, as each member knew they were not alone in their powers, as Calvin could do exactly what they could. Calvin eventually rose to become leader of the team, and helped make his world one where mutants, along with other heroes, are respected and treated with a level of fame and celebrity. Much like Wolverine, who in Rankin's reality is one of his closest friends, Rankin is fond of beer and music and has an unrequited love for Jean Grey. Rankin owns a chain of record stores and is a published author.

Although Rankin is accustomed to leading, he defers leadership to Blink on the grounds that she is from a reality that is more removed from the 'mainstream' universe than the other Exiles, and will therefore be able to make the judgement calls that their missions require without being potentially compromised by her connection to the counterparts of their opponents. Rankin also begins a romantic relationship with Blink. The Exiles' missions grow increasingly dangerous, and Mimic is forced to kill more than once to safeguard entire realities. Many of those he slays are alternate versions of heroes he knows as allies in his home reality and their deaths weigh heavily on his mind, Mimic coming to increasingly resent how so many versions of the people he knows have been corrupted by their power. After an encounter with the sorcery of a vampiric Union Jack, Mimic is trapped for four years on an Earth overrun by the Brood. On this Earth, he is implanted with a Brood egg. He returns to his teammates incubating an egg only held at bay by his acquired healing factor. The Brood egg hatches during a moment of weakness, and the possessed Rankin is forced to attack his teammates, killing Mariko Yashida (Sunfire). Devastated by his actions, Mimic swears never to kill again. During an encounter with Weapon X, Mimic is forced to mimic Deadpool's healing factor in order to survive. Unfortunately for Mimic, the healing factor also comes with Deadpool's unique skin condition; the very sight of which instigated a conflict with Blink concerning their relationship. After swearing never to kill again, his subsequent hesitation to do so, further compounded by an illusion in which Blink claims to no longer love him, allows the villain Proteus to possess him when the Exiles visit the House of M version of the regular Marvel Universe. After Proteus leaves Mimic's burnt husk of a corpse, the Exiles put his body into stasis. Blink later takes him back to his home reality for burial.

The Big M
Another alternate Mimic called The Big M was his world's greatest criminal and leader of the Brotherhood of Evil Mutants. With his team he slaughtered his reality's X-Men and committed numerous other crimes — including mass murder — until he was finally captured by the Avengers and sent to a high security prison.

He encounters the Exiles Mimic when the latter enters his dimension. Using his telepathy, The Big M reads the Exiles Mimic's mind and realizes that the only difference between the lives they led is that while one of them accepted Xavier's offer of training and help, the other rejected it and sought a more destructive path. He reforms and reinvents the Brotherhood as his world's X-Men. He retains the powers of Magneto, Professor X, Cannonball, Blink, and one unknown mutant.

X-Men: Evolution
In issue #6 of the X-Men: Evolution comic book, Mimic befriends Spyke but leaves the team due to his arrogance. His body apparently does not change in appearance when he copies powers, with the brief exception of taking on Nightcrawler's skin coloration.

Ultimate Marvel
An Ultimate Marvel equivalent of Mimic is a prototype super soldier weapon who is being sold on the black market. He was originally a soldier that served in Afghanistan who volunteered for the project, possibly due his admiration for Captain America. Shown to be transported by a terrorist cell in Bulgaria but intercepted, the collision activated his abilities while being released by the terrorists in the hopes of fighting the Ultimates. His powers go haywire while coming into contact with Scott Lang and is consoled by Giant-Man.

In other media

Television
 Mimic had a non-voiced cameo appearance in the X-Men animated series. In the episode "One Man's Worth" [Pt. 1], he appears as a member of the Mutant Resistance fighting a quadruped robot. He has Beast's muscular body, Angel's wings and Cyclops's optic blast, seemingly having the original X-Men's mutant powers permanently.

References

External links
 Mimic at Marvel.com
 Mimic at Marvel Wiki
 UncannyXmen.net Spotlight on Mimic
 UncannyXmen.net Spotlight on Mimic (Exiles)

Characters created by Stan Lee
Comics characters introduced in 1966
Fictional characters from New Jersey
Fictional characters with bipolar disorder
Marvel Comics characters who are shapeshifters
Marvel Comics characters who have mental powers
Marvel Comics characters with accelerated healing
Marvel Comics characters with superhuman strength
Marvel Comics male superheroes
Marvel Comics male supervillains
Marvel Comics mutants
Marvel Comics telekinetics
Marvel Comics telepaths
X-Men members